Mycenaean Revival is a rare revival architectural style developed as part of the twentieth century neoclassicist architectural revival in Greece.

The National Bank of Greece in Nafplio, built near the heart of the Mycenaean civilization in the 1930s by the architect Nikolaos Zouboulidis, is built in Mycenaean Revival, or neo-Mycenaean style. The door of the bank is an evocation of the form of the Lion Gate and the Tomb of Clytemnestra at Mycenae.  The form of the columns is copied from the column on the Lion Gate, and the building is painted in colors used at Mycenae.

References

Historicist architecture in Greece
Revival
Neoclassical architecture in Greece